Wanted is the fourth studio album by American rapper Bow Wow. The album was released on July 12, 2005, by Columbia Records and Sony Urban Music. The production of the album was primarily handled by Bow Wow's long-time producer Jermaine Dupri (who also executive produced the album) as well as LRoc, Bryan Michael Cox and No I.D. The album also features guest appearances by Omarion, Snoop Dogg, Ciara among others. This was Bow Wow's first album to contain uncensored profanity, although only one curse word is featured, specifically “nigga".

Wanted was supported by three singles: "Let Me Hold You" featuring singer Omarion, "Like You" featuring Ciara, and "Fresh Azimiz" featuring J-Kwon and Jermaine Dupri. "Big Dreams", the remix to "Fresh Azimiz" featuring Mike Jones and "Caviar" featuring Snoop Dogg, were service as an accompanying music videos. Clean versions of "Fresh Azimiz" and "Let Me Hold You" were recorded. The album received mixed to positive reviews from music critics and was commercially successful, debuting at number three on the US Billboard 200 chart, selling 120,000 copies in the first week, and eventually being certified platinum by the Recording Industry Association of America (RIAA) in December 2005.

Critical reception

The album received mixed to favorable reviews from music critics. Steve Jones of USA Today found some change in Bow Wow and his music, concluding with "This album doesn't break any new ground but marks the coming of age of a likable artist." David Jeffries of AllMusic praised Bow Wow for his charisma throughout the album, despite its B-level beats and that its marketing towards a teen demographic. He concluded that "At the very least, it's an interesting way to develop a child star into an adult star, and a hook-filled one at that." Angie Romero of Vibe highlighted the first two singles off the album but found everything else to be lackluster, saying "The rest of Wanted finds him struggling to carve his niche as a grown rapper minus the Bow Wow bounce. Matt Jost of RapReviews gave a mixed review, criticizing the generic production from Jermaine Dupri and finding Bow Wow to be unspectacular in the material given to him. He concluded by saying, "With Wanted, he's still 'in transition', chances for a turnaround are still intact, but the way things are looking Bow Wow is speeding down a dead-end street."

Commercial performance
Wanted debuted at number three on the US Billboard 200 chart, selling 120,000 copies in the first week., and becoming Bow Wow's third US top-ten album. In its second week, the album dropped to number five on the chart, selling an additional 61,000 copies. In its fifth week, the album returned to the top-ten at number ten, selling 51,000 copies. On December 19, 2005, the album was certified platinum by the Recording Industry Association of America (RIAA) for selling over a million copies. As of December 2006, the album has sold 956,000 copies in the United States.

Track listing

Notes
 signifies a co-producer.
"Go" features uncredited vocals by Jermaine Dupri.
"Is That You (P.Y.T.)" features additional vocals by Johntá Austin.
"Mo Money" contains the hidden bonus track "Eighteen" from Unleashed.

Sample credits
"Let Me Hold You" samples "If Only for One Night" performed by Luther Vandross, originally performed by Brenda Russell, and written by Brenda Russell.
"Like You" samples "I'm Leaving You Again" performed by New Edition, and written by Ricky Bell and Ralph Tresvant.
"Go" samples "Treat 'em Right" performed by Chubb Rock, and written McKinley Jackson, Robert Simpson, Melvin Steals and Howard Thompson.
"Is That You (P.Y.T.)" samples "P.Y.T. (Pretty Young Thing)" performed by Michael Jackson, and written by James Ingram and Quincy Jones.

Wanted Reloaded (dual disc)
The CD side of the disc contains the original 11 tracks.
DVD side
 "Do You [Enhanced Stereo] [DVD]"
 "Big Dreams [Enhanced Stereo] [DVD]"
 "Let Me Hold You [Enhanced Stereo] [DVD]"
 "Fresh Azimiz [Enhanced Stereo] [DVD]"
 "Caviar [Enhanced Stereo] [DVD]"
 "Like You [Enhanced Stereo] [DVD]
 "B.O.W. [Enhanced Stereo] [DVD]"
 "Go [Enhanced Stereo] [DVD]"
 "Do What It Do [Enhanced Stereo] [DVD]"
 "Is That You (P.Y.T.) [Enhanced Stereo] [DVD]"
 "Mo Money [Enhanced Stereo] [DVD]"
 "Like You (Behind-The-Scenes Footage) [DVD]"
 "Let Me Hold You (Direct Your Own Video) [DVD]"
 "Let Me Hold You [DVD] [Music Video]"
 "Like You Music Video [DVD] [Music Video]"
 "Bow Wow's Biggest Fans [DVD]"
Bonus DVD
 "Big Dreams (The Movie) [DVD]"
 "Caviar [DVD] [Multimedia Track]"

Personnel
Adapted from the Wanted liner notes.

 Jermaine Dupri: executive producer
 Diane McDonald: production coordinator
 Vlado Meller: mastering (Sony Music Studios, NYC)
 Chris Feldmann: art direction
 Christian Lantry: photography
 Teresa Caldwell and Taste Clothing Boutique: stylist
 Angela Henderson: styling assistant
 Shantel: hair
 Big D: security

Charts

Weekly charts

Year-end charts

Certifications

See also
 List of number-one rap albums of 2005 (U.S.)

References

2005 albums
Bow Wow (rapper) albums
Columbia Records albums
Albums produced by Bryan-Michael Cox
Albums produced by Jermaine Dupri
Albums produced by No I.D.
Albums produced by Swizz Beatz